Lakewood is a neighborhood in East Dallas, Texas (USA). It is adjacent to White Rock Lake and Northeast of Downtown Dallas. Lakewood is bound by Mockingbird Lane to the north, Abrams Road to the west, Gaston Avenue to the south, and White Rock Lake to the east.

About

Lakewood has the historic Lakewood Theater, which used to show classic films and host contemporary musical and comedy events. It has been renovated to house a bowling alley and gaming business, but retains the original exterior look and many interior elements. The Lakewood shopping area is an entire neighborhood of diverse restaurants and shopping venues. Nearby the Dallas Arboretum and Botanical Gardens has an extensive children's adventure garden housed within its 66 acres. Both overlook the White Rock Lake.

Lakewood is also home to Lakewood Country Club.

History

Lakewood proper is surrounded by a collection of historic neighborhoods, generally developed from the early 20th century to the 1950s, including Lakewood Heights, Junius Heights Historic District (Bungalow Heaven), Parks Estates, North Stonewall Terrace, Caruth Terrace, Wilshire Heights, Mockingbird Heights, Mockingbird Meadows, The Gated Cloisters, Hillside, Lakewood Hills (formerly Gastonwood-Coronado Hills), Hollywood Heights, and Belmont; among others. Commonly, people outside these neighborhoods group them together under the heading of Lakewood, The M-Streets, or Old East Dallas - which are overlapping regions in the near-eastern part of the city. Historic Swiss Avenue (Mansion Row) anchors the area towards Downtown.

Currently, there are a large number of Historic and Conservation Districts reflecting prodigious numbers of Craftsman, Prairie-Four Squares, Tudors, Spanish and Mediterranean Eclectic and Early Ranch homes, many of native Austin stone. Conservation Districts are zoning tools used by the city of Dallas regulate various architectural aspects of a home's construction. The homes range from two-bedroom bungalows to massive estates on acreage.  There are also duplexes, four-plexes and very small apartment complexes.

Some of the older, smaller homes are being torn down in favor of much larger, more expensive homes.

Government and infrastructure
The United States Postal Service operates the Lakewood Post Office at 6120 Swiss Avenue.

Education

Primary and secondary schools

Public schools (DISD) 

The Dallas Independent School District serves the Lakewood area. The area is within Trustee District 2D. In 2008 Jack Lowe represented the district, and it is now represented by Dustin Marshall.

Public schools serving the Lakewood subdivision include Lakewood Elementary School (K-5), J.L. Long Middle School (6-8), and Woodrow Wilson High School (9-12). Woodrow Wilson offers the IB Diploma Programme.

Eduardo Mata Montessori School, a K-8 school, gives second admission priority to people zoned to Woodrow Wilson High. Therefore, Lakewood is one of the neighborhoods with priority for the school.

Lakewood is also home of Lumin Education, a Montessori charter school serving ages 3 through 3rd grade.

Gallery of public schools

Private schools
Lakehill Preparatory School 
Saint Thomas Aquinas School

Preschool programs
Lakewood Early Childhood PTA serves the area.

Public libraries
The Dallas Public Library Lakewood Branch is located at 6121 Worth Street, 75214. The library is in Junius Heights.

Postal services
The United States Postal Service operates the Lakewood Post Office at 6120 Swiss Avenue, 75214-9998.

Popular events

Entertainment
The Shakespeare Festival of Dallas debuted in 1972 in the Bandshell at Fair Park before moving to its current home at Samuell Grand Amphitheatre — appropriately in Samuell Grand Park — in 1989.

Media
Advocate Magazines is the local magazine that covers a variety of neighborhood topics and has served the community since 1991.

Notable residents

References

External links
Lakewood Neighborhood Association
Home Source Dallas
Advocate, a community magazine serving the Lakewood neighborhood
Lakewood Service League
J. L. Long Middle School
Lakewood Elementary School
Lakewood Early Childhood PTA and Home Festival Fundraiser
Headlines about Lakewood and East Dallas from The Dallas Morning News
Lakehill Preparatory School
 Home - St. Thomas Aquinas Catholic School | Dallas, TX, PK-8
 Lumin Education | Early Childhood Learning | Dallas TX
 Lakewood Early Childhood PTA